The Vâlsan is a left tributary of the river Argeș in Romania. It discharges into the Argeș near Merișani.

The Vâlsan originates in the Făgăraș Mountains, where its source is a trough-shaped glacial hollow located between the Picuiata and Scărișoara Mare mountains. The river flows for a mere 84.6 kilometers. Its course runs parallel to the Argeș River. The Vâlsan River's mouth is located at Merișani.

In 1967 the Vâlsan's course was altered significantly by the construction of a reservoir and a hydroelectric plant.

Tributaries
The following rivers are tributaries to the river Vâlsan (from source to mouth):
Left tributaries: Zănoguța, Dobroneagu, Râul Cheii
Right tributaries: Izvorul Dimei, Izvorul Popii, Robaia, Valea Părului, Șoptana, Toplița, Bunești

Haven for a Fish Species
The Vâlsan, although a minor river in comparison to other European rivers, is of vital importance. This is because it is one of the few rivers that supports the fish species Romanichthys valsanicola. This species is endemic to Romania and the Danube basin. The species is regarded the most endangered species of European ichthyofauna given its small habitat range and low surviving numbers.

References

Rivers of Romania
Rivers of Argeș County